Jesse Barish is a musician and composer, most notable for writing the song "Count On Me" for Jefferson Starship; and several songs for Marty Balin, the former lead vocalist of Jefferson Starship including: "Hearts", "Atlanta Lady (Something About Your Love)", and "Do It for Love".

He was a known flutist and played flute with the seminal experimental band The Orkustra in San Francisco in the mid-1960s, and with John Phillips on Phillips' Wolf King of L.A. tour. In 1971, Barish was signed to Shelter Records by Denny Cordell and released the album Jesse, Wolff and Whings with guitarist Billy Wolff and drummer Kevin Kelley, who played with The Byrds and Rising Sons.

Landing in Marin County, California in the early 1970s, Barish became friends with Marty Balin who recorded "Count on Me" with Jefferson Starship and in 1981 had a hit with the song "Hearts" on Balin's first solo release Balin on EMI America Records.  Balin got Barish signed to RCA Records in the late 1970s and produced his first album Jesse Barish, then co-produced the second album Mercury Shoes with John Hug.

Since then Barish has been living in Venice, California, recorded several CDs produced by Jeff Pescetto, and continues to write songs and stay active in the world of music.

As the protégé to Marty Balin in the 1970s, they co produced music together after Balin split with Jefferson Starship to go solo. In 1981, Barish wrote the song “Hearts” for him to perform for his new album. The song has been so popular that it’s been covered by numerous musicians. Later in 2008, this song was released on Jesse Barish’s album “Farther Sun”, with an intimate acoustic guitar instrumentation compared to Balin’s.

Jesse Barish’s album Flute Salad has a ‘new age’ musical feel, and was done in collaboration with Jeff Pescetto and licensed through Void Echo Records. The album features Barish on flute, alto flute, and bass flute; and Pescetto playing other instruments.

Discography 
 Jesse Barish
 Mercury Shoes
 Cherry Road
 Selling Fire in July
 Nine Days from Nowhere
 Farther Sun
 Restless Soul
 Flute Salad
 Wheel Keep Turning

References

Year of birth missing (living people)
Living people